The Original Wasco County Courthouse is a historic former courthouse, located in The Dalles, Oregon, United States. It is listed on the National Register of Historic Places under the name First Wasco County Courthouse, and is also listed as a contributing resource in the National Register-listed Trevitt's Addition Historic District.

One of only two remaining courthouses from prior to Oregon statehood, this building served Wasco County from 1859 until 1882, and then as The Dalles city hall until 1907. From its original location in downtown The Dalles, it has been moved several times before its current location within Trevitt's Addition Historic District.

As of 2010, it was managed as a museum by the Wasco County Historical Society.

See also
National Register of Historic Places listings in Wasco County, Oregon

References

External links
Historic overview by the Wasco County Historical Society

Buildings and structures in The Dalles, Oregon
County courthouses in Oregon
National Register of Historic Places in Wasco County, Oregon
Museums in Wasco County, Oregon
1859 establishments in Oregon
Law enforcement museums in the United States
Historic district contributing properties in Oregon